A boutonnière or buttonhole (British English) is a floral decoration, typically a single flower or bud, worn on the lapel of a tuxedo or suit jacket.

While worn frequently in the past, boutonnières are now usually reserved for special occasions for which formal wear is standard, such as at proms, homecomings, funerals, and weddings. (Women who wear jackets on these occasions may also wear boutonnières, but more typically a woman would wear a corsage.) Nowadays, a lapel pin is worn more often than flowers on business suits.

Traditionally, a boutonnière was worn pushed through the lapel buttonhole (on the left, the same side as a pocket handkerchief) and the stem is held in place with a loop at the back of the lapel. The flower's calyx, if pronounced such as those of a carnation, should be fully inserted into the buttonhole which would secure it tightly and flat against the lapel. Thus the buttonhole should ideally be at least 1⅛" long for there to be enough room to fit a standard sized flower's calyx. Otherwise, the calyx would not fit into the buttonhole and the flower head would hang freely and move about in the wind.

However, on many recently made coats and jackets, the lapel is made without the loop required, which would normally sit on the reverse of the lapel, beneath the buttonhole. Sometimes, the lapel buttonhole is in the "keyhole" shape, as opposed to the traditional straight cut, or is not even pierced through, in which case the boutonnière may be pinned onto the jacket lapel, although this may be considered unsightly and continued pinning could eventually damage the cloth or silk facing.

History 
The word boutonnière derives from the French word for "buttonhole flower".  Similar to a wedding bouquet, in the 16th century, boutonnières were used to ward off bad luck and evil spirits. It was also used to keep bad scents away and believed to protect against diseases.

In the 18th century, however, many wore boutonnières as fashion statements. They were put on the buttonholes of frock coats. In most parts of Europe during this time, it was normal for men to wear fashionable clothes which included not only a boutonnière, but also breeches and boots. The French soon began to incorporate this style as well. 

In the 19th century, boutonnières became popular with followers of the Romantic movement, adding fresh color to attire. This was one of the many accessories that a man could add to his clothing to make him stand out from the crowd, similar to picking a pair of well polished shoes. Other popular accessories were chains, cigar cases, and jeweled pins.

In the 20th century, after World Wars I and II, the wearing of a flower on the lapel remained popular. Although worn less commonly as time went on, they served as a symbol of good breeding, elegance, and sophistication. This was due partly to the influence of cinema.

Today, boutonnières are still a part of a man’s formal attire, chiefly used on special occasions such as weddings, proms, or ceremonies. When worn at prom or weddings, they often match the flowers (corsages) of the bride or date. There are many types and styles of boutonnières to choose from. The groom, along with the groomsmen and the father of the bride, all wear boutonnières, adding a touch of elegance to the important event.

Flowers 
The flower itself is often a carnation, of which the most formal is white. The classic alternative is one in clove red.  Other colours and flowers may also be chosen to better coordinate with whatever else is being worn, such as a blue cornflower. A white gardenia is sometimes seen as a superior alternative to carnations given its scent and beauty.

At the University of Oxford in the United Kingdom it is tradition that students wear a carnation boutonnière while attending their formal examinations. This boutonnière is worn on the lapel of the students  subfusc, the style of formal academic dress at the University, but is not a compulsory part of the dress. The colour of the carnation indicates which examination the student is taking in that run of exams. At their first examination a white carnation is worn, at subsequent intermediate examination(s) a pink carnation is worn, and at their final examination a red carnation is worn.

References

External links

Ceremonial clothing
Fashion accessories
Floristry
Formal insignia